Alexandra Grace Brooks (born 19 January 1995) is an English footballer who plays as a goalkeeper for Blackburn Rovers in the FA Women's Championship.

Club career
Having come through their academy system, Alexandra Brooks made her first team debut for Manchester City when she replaced Karen Bardsley in an FA WSL Cup match against Durham on 13 July 2014. She would further occasional appearances for the next season and a half before a loan move to Everton for the duration of the 2016 season plus the half-length 2017 FA WSL Spring Series campaign. The following year she departed City for Sheffield United.

On 26 January 2019, Brooks moved back to the highest division of English football with a transfer to Birmingham City.

Career statistics

Club

Honours
Manchester City
Women's League Cup: 2014

References

External links

Living people
English women's footballers
Women's association football goalkeepers
Manchester City W.F.C. players
Everton F.C. (women) players
Sheffield United W.F.C. players
Birmingham City W.F.C. players
Women's Super League players
FA Women's National League players
Blackburn Rovers L.F.C. players
Footballers from Manchester
Fylde Ladies F.C. players
1995 births